Jonathan Alexander Agudelo Velásquez (born 17 December 1992) is a Colombian professional footballer who plays as  forward for Águilas Rionegro.

External links 
 

1992 births
Living people
Colombian footballers
Footballers from Medellín
Millonarios F.C. players
Independiente Santa Fe footballers
Jaguares de Córdoba footballers
Cúcuta Deportivo footballers
Club de Gimnasia y Esgrima La Plata footballers
Hapoel Be'er Sheva F.C. players
Águilas Doradas Rionegro players
Categoría Primera A players
Categoría Primera B players
Argentine Primera División players
Israeli Premier League players
Association football forwards
Expatriate footballers in Argentina
Expatriate footballers in Israel
Colombian expatriate sportspeople in Argentina
Colombian expatriate sportspeople in Israel